is a professional Japanese baseball player. He plays pitcher for the Saitama Seibu Lions.

External links

 NPB.com

1987 births
Living people
Baseball people from Ōita Prefecture
Nippon Professional Baseball pitchers
Saitama Seibu Lions players
Japanese expatriate baseball players in Australia
Melbourne Aces players